Tori Dam is an arch dam located in Toyama prefecture in Japan. The dam is used for flood control, irrigation and power production. The catchment area of the dam is 45.9 km2. The dam impounds about 103  ha of land when full and can store 31400 thousand cubic meters of water. The construction of the dam was started on 1958 and completed in 1967.

References

Dams in Toyama Prefecture
1967 establishments in Japan